Posidonia australis, also known as fibre-ball weed or ribbon weed, is a species of seagrass that occurs in the southern waters of Australia. It forms large meadows important to environmental conservation. Balls of decomposing detritus from the foliage are found along nearby shore-lines.

In 2022, a single stand in Shark Bay was reported by scientists to be the largest plant in the world.

Description

Posidonia australis is a flowering plant occurring in dense meadows, or along channels, in white sand. Subsurface rhizomes and roots provide stability in the sands it occupies. Erect rhizomes and leaves reduce the accumulation of silt.

They are bright green, perhaps becoming browned with age. The terminus of the leaf is rounded or absent through damage. They are arranged in groups with older leaves on the outside, longer and differing in form from the younger leaves they surround.

The species is monoecious. The flowers appear on small spikes on leafless stems, two bracts on each spike. The plant pollinates by hydrophily, by dispersing in the water.

Posidonia australis reproduction usually occurs through sexual or asexual methods but, under extreme conditions, by pseudovivipary.

A 2013 study showed that P. australis can sequester carbon 35 times more efficiently than rainforests.

In 2022, a study by the School of Biological Sciences and Oceans Institute at The University of Western Australia showed that a single plant of this species can grow vegetatively by using rhizomes to cover an extensive area, similar to buffalo grass. This particular specimen has double the number of chromosomes of other studied populations (40 chromosomes instead of the usual 20).

Distribution

This species is found in waters around the southern coast of Australia. In Western Australia is occurs in the Shark Bay region, around islands of the Houtman Abrolhos, and southward along the coast of the Swan Coastal Plain. The species is recorded at the edge of the Esperance Plains, the Archipelago of the Recherche, at the southern coast of the southwest region. The range extends to the east to coastal areas of New South Wales, South Australia, Tasmania, and Victoria.

A sign of a nearby occurrence of Posidonia is the presence of masses of decomposing leaves on beaches, forming fibrous balls.

Largest known organism

The plant is estimated to have taken at least 4,500 years to grow to this size by using rhizomes to colonise new parts of the seafloor, assuming a rhizome growth rate of around  a year. This age puts it among the oldest known clonal plants too.

Taxonomy
This species is a member of the family Posidoniaceae, one of eight occurring in Australia. The ninth member, Posidonia oceanica, is found in the Mediterranean sea. The genus name for this species, Posidonia, is given for the god of the seas Poseidon, and australis refers to the southern distribution.

The species was first described by Joseph Hooker in Flora Tasmaniae. Common names for the plant include fibre-ball weed and ribbon weed.

Conservation status 
IUCN lists this species as "near threatened", while the meadows in New South Wales have been listed by the Commonwealth of Australia as an endangered ecological community since 2015.

Bioactivity 
A recent in silico study showed that the leaf proteins of Posidonia australis could be a good source of antioxidant peptides when consumed by humans. The virtual screening study reported that such peptides could participate in the scavenging of free radicals. They could also potentially inhibit the activities of myeloperoxidase, xanthine oxidase, and Kelch-like ECH-associated protein, thus reducing cellular production of reactive oxygen species.

References

External links
Posidonia australis occurrence data from Australasian Virtual Herbarium

australis
Flora of New South Wales
Flora of South Australia
Flora of Tasmania
Flora of Victoria (Australia)
Angiosperms of Western Australia
Monocots of Australia
Largest organisms